Delhi Technological University is a state university situated in Delhi, India.

Notable alumni

Fields with a — have unknown values.

Architecture

Arts and entertainment

Business

Civil Services

Science and technology

Other

Notes

References

 
Delhi Technological University alumni
Delhi Technological University alumni